Edgbastonia corrugata  is a species of small freshwater snails which have an operculum. They are aquatic gastropod mollusks in the family Tateidae. 

Subspecies
 Edgbastonia corrugata corrugata (Ponder & G. A. Clark, 1990)
 Edgbastonia corrugata umbilicata Ponder, W.-H. Zhang, Hallan & Shea, 2019

This species is endemic to Australia.

See also
 List of non-marine molluscs of Australia

References

Further reading

External links

 Ponder W., Zhang W.-H. (Wei-Hong), Hallan A. & Shea M. (2019). New taxa of Tateidae (Caenogastropoda, Truncatelloidea) from springs associated with the Great Artesian Basin and Einasleigh Uplands, Queensland, with the description of two related taxa from eastern coastal drainages. Zootaxa. 4583(1): 1-67

Tateidae
Gastropods of Australia
Endemic fauna of Australia
Vulnerable fauna of Australia
Gastropods described in 1990